Philosophy in the Boudoir may refer to:

 La Philosophie dans le boudoir or Philosophy in the Bedroom, a 1795 work by the Marquis de Sade
 La Philosophie dans le boudoir, a 1947 painting by René Magritte